Mischbrot is German bread made from the mixture of wheat and rye flour with sourdough or yeast.  It is known as "Gray bread" in some regions of Germany (e.g., parts of North Rhine-Westphalia, Bavaria and Hesse) or as "Black bread" in southern Germany, Austria, and Switzerland.

It has a milder taste than rye bread and looser crumbs. Most of the bread offered in Germany is mischbrot.

A distinction is made between two categories, namely "Rye mischbrot" and "Wheat mischbrot", each of which must consist of more than 50 percent of the corresponding grain type.

References

External links 
The Guiding Rules of Breads and Buiskets (BMEL)（in German）

Breads
German cuisine